VIBGYOR Group of Schools is a chain of schools, the first of which was established in 2004 in Goregaon, Mumbai, India. Under the leadership of Rustom Kerawalla, Founder Chairman of the Institution, the VIBGYOR Group has opened 40 schools in fourteen major cities.

VIBGYOR Group's educational institutions include pre-schools under the name of VIBGYOR Kids and primary and secondary schools under the name of VIBGYOR High. VIBGYOR High offers a choice between the Indian Certificate of Secondary Education (ICSE), Central Board of Secondary Education (CBSE), International General Certification of Secondary Education (IGCSE) and A-level, depending on the school chosen.

Vibgyor School List 
The first VIBGYOR High school was established in 2004, at Goregoan West, Mumbai, India. As of July 2018, the institution owns 40 schools across India.

Haryana

Gurgaon

 VIBGYOR High Gurgaon, Sector 67

Maharashtra

Kalyan 

 VIBGYOR Roots and Rise, Khadakpada

Kolhapur

VIBGYOR Kids and High School, Uchgaon

Mumbai 

VIBGYOR Kids and High School, Goregaon
VIBGYOR Kids and High School, Malad East
VIBGYOR Roots and Rise, Malad West, Mumbai
VIBGYOR Kids and High School, Borivali

Navi Mumbai 

VIBGYOR Kids and High School, Airoli, Navi Mumbai
VIBGYOR Kids and High School, Kharghar, Navi Mumbai

Pune 

VIBGYOR Kids and High School, Balewadi
VIBGYOR Roots and Rise Chinchwad
VIBGYOR Roots and Rise Fursungi
VIBGYOR Kids and High School, Hinjewadi
VIBGYOR Kids and High School, NIBM, Pune
VIBGYOR Roots and Rise Pimple Saudagar
VIBGYOR Kids and High School, Yerwada
VIBGYOR Kids and High School, Magarpatta
VIBGYOR Roots and Rise School, Wagholi

Nashik

 VIBGYOR Roots and Rise School, Makhmalabad

Madhya Pradesh

Indore

 VIBGYOR Roots and Rise, Vijay Nagar

Karnataka

Bangalore 

VIBGYOR Kids and High School, Bannerghatta
VIBGYOR Kids and High School, BTM Layout
VIBGYOR Roots and RISE School Doddanekkundi
VIBGYOR Kids and High School, Electronic city
VIBGYOR Kids and High School, Haralur
 This school has two separate buildings- one for grades 3-12 which is Vibgyor High and one for grades Nursery- 2 which is Vibgyor Kids. They are located in close proximity to each other.
VIBGYOR Kids and High School, Hennur
VIBGYOR Kids and High School, Horamavu
VIBGYOR Kids and High School, HSR Layout
VIBGYOR Kids and High School, Jakkur
VIBGYOR Kids and High School, Kadugodi
VIBGYOR Kids and High School, Marathahalli
VIBGYOR Roots and RISE School Panathur
VIBGYOR Kids and High School, Yelahanka

Mangalore 

 VIBGYOR Roots and Rise School, Kulur

Tamil Nadu

Coimbatore 
 VIBGYOR Kids and High School, Coimbatore

Gujarat

Surat 

VIBGYOR Kids and High School, Magdalla

Vadodara 

VIBGYOR Kids and High School, Padra

VIBGYOR schools perform well in ICSE evaluation

Uttar Pradesh

Lucknow 

VIBGYOR Kids and High School, Gomti Nagar

Affiliations
CBSE
ICSE
CAIE (Cambridge Assessment International Education: IGCSE / A Levels)
ISC ( Indian School Certificate-A subsection of ICSE)

Result information and awards
Vibgyor High achieved 100% results in 2015, across schools in Mumbai, Pune, Vadodara and Bangalore ICSE Class 10 examinations. In 2015, the number of students who took the Class ten boards from several schools across India was around 1.59 lakh with a pass percentage of 98.49%. Of the 253 students, who appeared for the examinations this year from Vibygor High, 40% from across centres scored more than 90% marks, while 93% achieved distinction.

VIBGYOR High Group of Schools has been awarded in two categories – 'Best Operational Excellence in K12 Educational Institutes' and 'Award for Quality in Education' at the World Education Congress 2016, held at Taj Lands End, Mumbai.  Ashish Tibdewal, CEO & CFO, VIBGYOR High Group of Schools received the award on behalf of the institution from Lytou Bouapao, Deputy Minister, Ministry of Education and Sports, Lao PDR.

VIBGYOR Group of schools was awarded with the "K-12 School Chain of the year" in the west zone and "Best Sport Empowerment" awards at the 5th Annual Indian Education Congress 2015, held in New Delhi.

Vibygor High School, Goregaon and Vibygor High School, Malad were ranked at No. 1 and No. 2 in the Zone D region of Mumbai, respectively. Both the schools have also been ranked at No. 8 and No. 10 respectively amongst the Top 19 Schools in the Mumbai region. Vibygor High was selected from over 500 schools, which were shortlisted. 
The survey was conducted by Times Group, in partnership with i3 Research Consultants to determine the top schools in each zone in Mumbai. The team conducted an exhaustive sample survey of 910 across seven zones of Mumbai.

Vibgyor High International School had 87 students of which 26 secured 90% and above and 30 secured 80-90%.

Student achievements
Arjun Badshah of Vibgyor High (Goregaon) reached to pre-quarters with 21–10 in the Boys' U-12 Round of the CCI-MSSA inter-school badminton tournament.

Rajvarshan S B of Vibgyor High (Vadodara) won the state chess competition (U-7) in the year of 2017 and had reached to National tournament in the same year.

VIBGYOR Group Of School has been recognised as 'Times Education Icons 2019' by Times of India.

Sarin Patel of Vibgyor High Haralur (Bengaluru) wrote two books and is a young author.

Controversies

Student's expulsion and MNS protests
In 2010, Maharashtra Navnirman Sena (MNS) activists allegedly ransacked Vibgyor High School in Mumbai, protesting against the expulsion of a female student at the Goregaon school, reportedly because her mother had led morchas against the fee hike effected by the school.

Principal of Pune school held for land scam
In 2013, the principal of Vibgyor High Pune and her spouse were arrested in Hyderabad for allegedly trying to sell defence land to a Hyderabad-based education trust for Rs 18.5 crore, claiming to be the owners.

Pune School directed to refund fees on cancellation of admission
A consumer forum in Pune ordered Pune-based Vibgyor High School to refund the entire fees upon cancellation of admission to the father of two children besides paying a compensation of Rs 10,000.

Bangalore rape incident
On 2 July 2014, a six-year-old female student was allegedly raped by two staff members of Vibgyor High School, Marathahalli, Bangalore. A medical examination confirmed the girl was sexually abused.  The incident triggered large-scale protests in Bangalore and across India. Eight staff members were detained by police in connection with the incident. The Bangalore Police initially arrested a skating instructor at the school, although he was later released as innocent. Two gym teachers at the school were then arrested for the crime a couple of weeks later. Charges of gang rape were filed against the two in October.

Following the rape incident, Karnataka government transferred Bangalore City Police Commissioner Raghavendra Auradkar.

The chairman of the chain of schools, Rustom Kerawala, was arrested on 23 July 2014 on charges of intentionally suppressing information about the rape. He was later released on bail, and charges were filed in October 2014 under The Protection of Children from Sexual Offenses Act.

Refusal to refund fees
Several parents moved their children to other schools due to the lack of accountability shown by Vibgyor management. The Department of Public Instruction (DPI) has directed the controversy-hit Vibgyor High School in Marathahalli to refund the full amount to the parents who opt to take their children out of the school. Several parents complained that even after the DPI order, the school was denying refund of the amount.

Bus incident

On October 7, 2019, a school bus of Vibgyor high NIBM Road failed to drop a girl student at her home, instead taking her 15 kilometres from her home.

Viva
VIVA is the annual cultural festival of VIBGYOR Group of Schools. The latest VIVA was named -Viva La Vida. Usually, VIVA has carnivals, sports and performing arts competitions. Students of different branches meet to celebrate the inter-school festival.

Sport and performing arts: SPA
The school has a separate department of faculty and teachers, for its co-curricular program- SPA. Students can avail a range of sports, athletics and performing arts like cricket, football, drama, music, skating, swimming, etc.

See also 

List of schools in Maharashtra

References

External links
 

Cambridge schools in India
Central Board of Secondary Education
Educational institutions established in 2004
Educational organisations based in India
High schools and secondary schools in Gujarat
High schools and secondary schools in Karnataka
High schools and secondary schools in Maharashtra
High schools and secondary schools in Uttar Pradesh
Schools in Gurgaon
Schools in Haryana
Education in Kalyan-Dombivli
Schools in Indore
Private schools in Madhya Pradesh
Schools in Madhya Pradesh
2004 establishments in Maharashtra